Hans Gissinger is a Swiss commercial, editorial, and fine-art photographer whose work has received wide exposure, thanks in part to Michael Pollan’s best-selling book The Omnivore's Dilemma, which features a Gissinger photograph on its cover image.

Gissinger has also photographed for worldwide brands such as Jaguar, Condé Nast, Donna Karan, Nike, Ebel, Cartier, Ruinart Champagne, The New York Times Magazine, Vanity Fair, Vogue, Neiman Marcus, and Lincoln Mercury. His work has been featured in several individual exhibitions in museums and galleries in the United States and in France, including the Musée de la Chasse et de la Nature in Paris in 2000 and the Musée de la Citadelle in 2004, as well as in numerous group exhibitions in France and around the world. His work can be found in important private and public collections in Europe and the United States.

He is based in New York City.

Career
Gissinger was born in 1946 in Zurich, Switzerland, and lived there until finishing his secondary education. After his military service, he traveled throughout Europe practicing different professions. He returned to Switzerland in 1970 and began working for the film and photography department of Pro Helvetia, a governmental cultural-exchange foundation.

In 1972, Gissinger relocated to Vézelay in the Burgundy region of France. There he befriended Claude Stassart and his son Gilles who would play an important role Gissinger’s future publishing projects.

By 1976, Gissinger was devoting all of his time and energy to photography, quickly building a successful career in Switzerland, Germany, Italy, England and France. Curiosity took him to Los Angeles in 1987, followed by a second trip to the United States to establish links with his art agent.

After relocating to New York in 1994, Gissinger began to launch the artistic projects he had been planning in the area of photography and the publication of unique, experimental books. The first of these, La Conversation, was published in the United States in 2000. Created in collaboration with chef Marc Meneau, the book featured 370 of Gissinger’s black-and-white photographs and text by Gilles Stassart and Meneau.

His second book, Salami, was published in 2001. Also a collaboration with Gilles Stassart, the book included a text by Gérard Oberlé and 60 portraits of Italian sausages. At the same time, Gissinger produced a series of 15 large-format two-color silk screens on canvas taken from La Conversation. In 2003, Gissinger began a third project with New York chef Frank De Carlo on the theme of fire.

In 2005, Gissinger began a project called “Tartas,” a collaboration with world-renowned pastry chef Christian Escribà. The two wanted to celebrate the 100th birthday of Escribà’s eponymous Barcelona-based bakery, so they decided to create a series of photos and video of exploding cakes. “The exploding cake calls out for lightness, freedom, and the refusal of manipulation,” reads a line from the pair’s official description of the project. “It’s always nice to explode things,” Gissinger has said. “It’s somehow happy.”

In 2009, Gissinger won a Silver Medal from the Society of Publication Designers for photographs commissioned by Martha Stewart Living magazine. The title of the article was “Exemplary Eggs.”

Bibliography
 "La Conversation", Woodstock Editions, 2000 
 "Salami ", Woodstock Editions, 2001

Notes

References
Website of Darren Haggar, Penguin Press art director who worked on The Omnivore’s Dilemma, April 2006
"The Best in Show: PUB 44 Medal Winners," Society of Publication Designers website, May 11, 2009
Hans Gissinger exhibition listed at photography-now.com, 2005
Artist bio, Meter Gallery
Artist bio, Hans Gissinger’s website

External links
official site
“Tartas” video

Swiss photographers
Living people
Fine art photographers
Artists from Zürich
1946 births